A defensible space, in the context of fire control, is a natural and/or landscaped area around a structure that has been maintained and designed to reduce fire danger. The practice is sometimes called  firescaping. "Defensible space" is also used in the context of wildfires, especially in the wildland-urban interface (WUI). This defensible space reduces the risk that fire will spread from one area to another, or to a structure, and provides firefighters access and a safer area from which to defend a threatened area. Firefighters sometimes do not attempt to protect structures without adequate defensible space, as it is less safe and less likely to succeed.

Criteria
A first concept of defensible space for most fire agencies' primary goal of fuel reduction is a recommended or required defensible space around a structure to extend for at least  in all directions.
A second concept of defensible space is "fuel reduction." This means plants are selectively thinned and pruned to reduce the combustible fuel mass of the remaining plants. The goal is to break up the more continuous and dense uninterrupted layer of vegetation.
A third concept of defensible space is "fuel ladder" management. Like rungs on a ladder, vegetation can be present at varying heights from groundcover to trees. Ground fuel "rungs", such as dried grasses, can transmit fire to shrub rungs, which then transmit up tree branch rungs into the tree canopy. A burning tree produces embers that can blow to new areas, spreading and making it more difficult to control a wildland fire. One guideline is for a typical separation of three times the height of the lower fuel to the next fuel ladder. Since wildfires burn faster uphill than on flat land, fuel ladder spacing may need to be greater for slopes.

Landscape use
The term defensible space in landscape ("firescape") use refers to the  zone surrounding a structure. Often the location is in the wildland–urban interface. This area need not be devoid of vegetation by using naturally fire resistive plants that are spaced, pruned and trimmed, and irrigated, to minimize the fuel mass available to ignite and also to hamper the spread of a fire.

The first  is the "Defensible Space Zone," of a defensible space around a structure. It is where vegetation is kept to a minimum combustible mass. A guideline used in this zone can be "low, lean and green." Trees should be kept to a minimum of ten feet from other trees to reduce risk of fire spread between trees. Wood piles should be kept in zone 2. No branches should be touching or hanging over the roof of the house or within 10 feet of the structure to help keep the structure safe. Any dead vegetation or plants from zone 1 should be removed, and vegetation near windows should be pruned or removed. 
In this area of the defensible space, fuels/vegetation are separated vertically and horizontally depending on the vegetation type. This is done by: thinning, pruning, and removal of selected vegetation; and removing lower limbs from trees closer to lower vegetation and the lateral separation of tree canopies. Grass height should not exceed 4 inches. Trees should be 10 feet away from each other on a flat to mild slope but should be double that on a mild to moderate slope. Shrubs should be as far away as twice its height for flat to mid-slope but 4 times its height for mild to moderate slope. Leaves, twigs, needles, clones, bark, and small branches should be removed but can be left up to a depth of 3 inches. Vertical space from trees to ground should be 6 feet while the vertical distance from a tree to a shrub should be the height of the shrub times three.

An important component is ongoing maintenance of the fire-resistant landscaping for reduced fuel loads and fire fighting access. Fire-resistive plants that are not maintained can desiccate, die, or amass deadwood debris, and become fire assistive. Irrigation systems and pruning can help maintain a plant's fire resistance. Maintaining access roads and driveways clear of side and low-hanging vegetation can allow large fire equipment to reach properties and structures. Some agencies recommend clearing combustible vegetation at minimum horizontal 10 ft from roads and driveways a vertical of 13 ft 6 inches above them. Considering the plant material involved is important to not create unintended consequences to habitat integrity and unnecessary aesthetic issues. Street signs, and homes clearly identified with the numerical address, assist access also.

Unintended consequences
The unintended negative consequences of erosion and native habitat loss can result from some unskillful defensible space applications. The disturbance of the soil surface, such as garden soil cultivation in and firebreaks beyond native landscape zones areas, destroys the native plant cover and exposes open soil, accelerating invasive species of plants ("invasive exotics") spreading and replacing native habitats.

In suburban and wildland–urban interface areas, the vegetation clearance and brush removal ordinances of municipalities for defensible space can result in mistaken excessive clearcutting of native and non-invasive introduced shrubs and perennials that exposes the soil to more light and less competition for invasive plant species, and also to erosion and landslides. Negative aesthetic consequences to natural and landscaped areas can be minimized with integrated and balanced defensible space practices.

See also

Fire ecology
Firefighting
Wildfire suppression

References

External links
CAL-FIRE: Homepage + Links Official CA State Board of Forestry and Fire Protection website.
CA State Board of Forestry and Fire Protection: "General Guidelines for Creating Defensible Space"
SBCFD Homepage + Links: "Defending Your Home and Hazard Reduction" Official Santa Barbara County Fire Department 'Wildfire' Website.
Santa Barbara County Fire Department: "Landscape Checklist"
Santa Barbara County Fire Department: "Homeowner Checklist"	

Wildfire prevention
Wildfire suppression
Gardening aids
Sustainable forest management
Wildfires